Academy of the Holy Names, or AHN, in Albany, New York, United States, is an independent,  Middle States accredited Catholic girls' college-preparatory school for girls in grades 6–12.  It is located within the Roman Catholic Diocese of Albany.  The school was founded in 1884 by the Sisters of the Holy Names of Jesus and Mary. The mission of AHN is to prepare its students to become cultural, intellectual, moral, and spiritual leaders. Current enrollment for the 2021–2022 school year is 196 students.

History
Academy of the Holy Names has been a preparatory school in the Albany area for over a century, having first opened its doors as the Academy of Notre Dame on September 10, 1884.
 
The school was first located on Hamilton Street in Albany, but less than a year after its opening, the Sisters of the Holy Names of Jesus and Mary purchased property at 628 Madison Avenue and began preparations to move the academy. By June 1890, Regents examinations had been given for the first time, and three students had become the first graduating class. It was not until 1899 that the academy established by the Sisters became known as The Academy of the Holy Names.
 
In 1922, the Sisters purchased the Hennessey Farm on New Scotland Road, but it was not until 1957 that a school building was placed on the property. In that year, the Sisters opened a new high school building for grades 9 through 12 at 1075 New Scotland Road. The Madison Avenue building still housed the grade school and junior high.
 
By 1963, enrollment had increased to such an extent that the Sisters thought it advisable to maintain two high schools, one at Madison Avenue which was The Academy of the Holy Names and one on New Scotland Road christened Marylrose Academy. Eventually the high school on Madison Avenue was forced to move in 1967 to a wing at Marylrose Academy and the lower and middle schools (K-8) moved to the New Scotland Road campus in 1968.

Because of the long tradition of excellence in education associated with the name Holy Names and because of the common heritage of the facilities located on the New Scotland Road campus, it seemed appropriate to turn to a name that would signify the quality of accomplishment and unity of vision of the campus. Hence, in 1973, the campus became known as the Holy Names Campus, and Marylrose Academy became Academy of the Holy Names Upper School.
 
Today the quality of education at the academy continues to flourish. Holy Names students have the opportunity to participate in an academic program featuring flexible scheduling, interdisciplinary courses, service, and computer science as well as extracurricular activities including student government, publications and interscholastic sports. While continuing their commitment to tradition, both schools, the Upper School and  Middle School, continue to move ahead in new directions. The 2009–2010 academic year, marked the 125th anniversary of Academy of the Holy Names.

In January 2016, it was announced that Academy of the Holy Names would discontinue Pre-K through 5th grade education at the end of the 2015–2016 academic year due to declining enrollment. Academy of the Holy Names continues to flourish as a 6-12th grade institution.

Traditions

School Prayer
This is said every morning during announcements, after a reading from Scripture:
"Blessed Mother Marie Rose, we firmly believe in the power of your intercession with almighty God: Father, Son, and Holy Spirit. We beg you to hear our humble prayers and to obtain for us the favors which we now ask in the silence of our hearts. God, our father, knows all, can do all things, and loves us. Sure of God’s love and strong in our faith, together with you, Blessed Mother Marie Rose, we accept God’s most holy will. Through Jesus Christ.  Amen."

Activities

Clubs
 School Musical
 Pep Club
 SADD
 Math Club
 Mock Trial Team
 Forensics Team
 Environmental Club
 Cheerleading
 Multicultural Club
 Black Student Alliance
 Junior Ladies of Charity/Service Club

Sports
Both Varsity and Junior Varsity teams are offered, as well as one Freshman team for basketball.
Holy Names competes in the following sports:
 Fall
 Volleyball
 Soccer
 Cross country
 Tennis
 Cheerleading
 Swimming and Diving
 Winter
 Basketball
 Indoor track and field
 Basketball cheerleading
 Alpine ski team
 Spring
 Softball
 Track and field
 Lacrosse
 Golf

Cheerleaders at Holy Names cheer for the football and basketball teams of Christian Brothers Academy.

Miscellaneous
The school belongs to the Colonial Council Athletics Conference.

Notable past students
Kirsten Gillibrand, one-term Democratic Representative of the state's 20th congressional district (2007-2009) and current United States Senator (since 2009).
 Paige DeSorbo, reality television personality on the show “Summer House” on Bravo TV.
 Teressa Foglia '2006, entrepreneur and fashion hat maker.

See also
 List of high schools in New York
 List of Catholic schools in New York

Notes and references

External links
 Academy of the Holy Names School website
 AHN at the Capital Region Independent Schools Association

1884 establishments in New York (state)
Educational institutions established in 1884
Girls' schools in New York (state)
Private elementary schools in New York (state)
Private middle schools in New York (state)
Private high schools in Albany County, New York
Sisters of the Holy Names of Jesus and Mary
Private schools in Capital District (New York)
Education in Albany, New York
Catholic secondary schools in New York (state)
Roman Catholic Diocese of Albany
Organizations based in Albany, New York